Tantau may refer to:

 Rosen Tantau, a German flower breeding company
 "Tantau", a song by Diatribe from their EP Therapy
 Tantau Avenue in Cupertino, California, the street on which many offices of Apple Inc are located